Temyakovo is a rural locality (a village) in Starotumbagushevsky Selsoviet, Sharansky District, Bashkortostan, Russia. The population was 107 as of 2010. There are 4 streets.

Geography 
Temyakovo is located 15 km north of Sharan (the district's administrative centre) by road. Yelan-Yelga is the nearest rural locality.

References 

Rural localities in Sharansky District